Phillip Dillard (born December 10, 1986) is a former American football linebacker. He was drafted by the New York Giants in the fourth round of the 2010 NFL Draft. He attended Jenks High School in Jenks, Oklahoma, where he was rated as one of the nation's top high school linebackers, then played college football at Nebraska.  He is the older brother of another highly ranked high school prospect, former Oklahoma University football cornerback Gabe Lynn.

He was waived by the Giants on September 3, 2011. On November 8, 2011, he was signed to the Panthers practice squad.

References

External links
New York Giants bio
Nebraska Cornhuskers bio

1986 births
Living people
Sportspeople from Tulsa, Oklahoma
Players of American football from Oklahoma
American football linebackers
Nebraska Cornhuskers football players
New York Giants players
Carolina Panthers players